is a former Japanese football player.

Playing career
Yamato was born in Osaka Prefecture on May 30, 1978. He joined J1 League club Cerezo Osaka from youth team in 1997. On June 3, 1998, he debuted against Avispa Fukuoka in J.League Cup. On November 7, he debuted against Sanfrecce Hiroshima in J1 League when the remaining games are 2 games. He also played last game in this season. However he could not play at all in the match in 1999 and retired end of 1999 season.

Club statistics

References

External links

1978 births
Living people
Association football people from Osaka Prefecture
Japanese footballers
J1 League players
Cerezo Osaka players
Association football midfielders